Claude Greff (born 2 June 1954) was a member of the National Assembly of France from 2002 to 2017.  She represented the 2nd constituency of the Indre-et-Loire department, as a member of the Union for a Popular Movement.

References

1954 births
Living people
People from Briey
Union for a Popular Movement politicians
Gaullism, a way forward for France
Secretaries of State of France
Deputies of the 12th National Assembly of the French Fifth Republic
Deputies of the 13th National Assembly of the French Fifth Republic
Deputies of the 14th National Assembly of the French Fifth Republic
Politicians from Centre-Val de Loire